A by-election for the seat of Port Darwin in the Northern Territory Legislative Assembly was held on 11 March 2000. The by-election was triggered by the resignation of former CLP Chief Minister Shane Stone. The seat had been held by Stone since 1990.

The CLP selected Sue Carter as its candidate. The Labor candidate was Ian Fraser. Former Labor candidate for Fannie Bay Susan Bradley contested as an Independent.

Results

References

2000 elections in Australia
Northern Territory by-elections
2000s in the Northern Territory